AUSMIN, the Australia-United States Ministerial Consultation, is the main annual forum for consultations between Australia and the United States. It has been held most years since 1985, with the meetings alternating between locations in the Australia and the United States. It involves the Australian Ministers for Foreign Affairs and Defence as well as the US Secretaries of State and Defense, with senior officials from both portfolios.

The events are important in the relationship between Australia and the United States, and they enable discussion on major global and regional political issues, as well as deepening bilateral foreign security and defense cooperation.

60th anniversary of ANZUS
The Australia-United States Ministerial consultations were held in the United States on 15 September 2011. The 2011 event marked the 60th anniversary of the Australia, New Zealand, and United States (ANZUS) alliance. It was attended by US Secretary of Defense Leon Panetta, US Secretary of State Hillary Clinton, the Australian Minister for Foreign Affairs Kevin Rudd, and the Australian Minister for Defence Stephen Smith.

2012
The 2012 consultations were held in Perth, Western Australia.

References

Australia–United States relations
Recurring events established in 1951